Born a Champion is a 2021 American martial arts drama directed by Alex Ranarivelo and written by Sean Patrick Flanery and Ranarivelo. It stars Flanery, Dennis Quaid and Katrina Bowden. The film also features mixed martial arts fighter Edson Barboza, with appearances by Renzo Gracie and Mickey Gall.

Plot
Mickey Kelley, a former marine and one of the first American black belts in Brazilian jiu-jitsu, gets pulled away from everything he loves and into an unsanctioned MMA tournament.

Cast
 Sean Patrick Flanery as Mickey Kelley
 Katrina Bowden as Layla
 Dennis Quaid as Mason
 Maurice Compte as Rosco
 Currie Graham as Burchman
 Costas Mandylor as Dimitris
 Reno Wilson as Terry Pittman
 Ali Afshar as The Sheik
 Edson Barboza as Marco Blaine

Production 
Forrest Films announced their intent to film Born a Champion, then titled Mickey Kelley, in July 2019. Alex Ranarivelo was named as the director and actors Sean Patrick Flanery, Katrina Bowden, and Dennis Quaid were also announced as some of the film's central characters. Flanery also served as one of the film's producers and co-wrote the script alongside Ranarivelo. Flanery called the film a "love letter to BJJ" in the film's credits, as a result of "what it’s done for me; how it’s changed me; what it’s done for my perspective on life, love and happiness and family."

Filming took place in Petaluma, California during the summer of 2019 and wrapped in August of the same year.

Release
The film received a limited release in select theaters in the United States on January 22, 2021 and became available via video on demand the same day. It was released on Blu-ray and DVD on January 26, 2021.

References

External links
 
 
 

2021 action drama films
2021 films
2021 martial arts films
American action drama films
American martial arts films
Mixed martial arts films
2020s English-language films
2020s American films